Miguel Ángel Fernández Ruiz (born 21 March 1997) is a Spanish cyclist, who currently rides for UCI ProTeam .

Major results
2017
 7th Vuelta Ciclista a La Rioja
2021
 1st 
 1st Stage 1 Vuelta a Extremadura
 1st Stage 2 
2023
 1st Stage 5 La Tropicale Amissa Bongo

References

External links

1997 births
Living people
Spanish male cyclists
Sportspeople from Santander, Spain
Cyclists from Cantabria